ATP-dependent RNA helicase DDX50 is an enzyme that in humans is encoded by the DDX50 gene.

DEAD box proteins, characterized by the conserved motif Asp-Glu-Ala-Asp (DEAD), are putative RNA helicases. They are implicated in a number of cellular processes involving alteration of RNA secondary structure such as translation initiation, nuclear and mitochondrial splicing, and ribosome and spliceosome assembly. Based on their distribution patterns, some members of this DEAD box protein family are believed to be involved in embryogenesis, spermatogenesis, and cellular growth and division. This gene encodes a DEAD box enzyme that may be involved in ribosomal RNA synthesis or processing. This gene and DDX21, also called RH-II/GuA, have similar genomic structures and are in tandem orientation on chromosome 10, suggesting that the two genes arose by gene duplication in evolution. This gene has pseudogenes on chromosomes 2, 3 and 4. Alternative splicing of this gene generates multiple transcript variants, but the full length nature of all the other variants but one has not been defined.

References

Further reading